Yaopu is a town of Nanqiao District, Chuzhou in eastern Anhui province, China. , it has 4 residential communities and 5 villages under its administration.

See also
List of township-level divisions of Anhui

References

Towns in Anhui
Chuzhou